Ali Pirouj (born 22 January 1998) is an Iranian Paralympic athlete. He represented Iran at the 2020 Summer Paralympics in Tokyo, Japan and won the silver medal in the men's javelin throw F13 event.

References

External links 
 
 

1998 births
Living people
Paralympic athletes of Iran
Paralympic silver medalists for Iran
Paralympic medalists in athletics (track and field)
Athletes (track and field) at the 2020 Summer Paralympics
Medalists at the 2020 Summer Paralympics
Iranian male javelin throwers
21st-century Iranian people